The 2014–15 Rhode Island Rams basketball team represented the University of Rhode Island during the 2014–15 NCAA Division I men's basketball season. The Rams, led by third year head coach Dan Hurley, played their home games at the Ryan Center and were members of the Atlantic 10 Conference. They finished the season 23–10, 13–5 in A-10 play to finish in a tie for second place. They advanced to the semifinals of the A-10 tournament where they lost to Dayton. They were invited to the National Invitation Tournament where they defeated Iona in the first round before losing in the second round to Stanford.

Previous season
The Rams finished the season with an overall record of 14–18, with a record of 5–11 in the Atlantic 10 regular season to finish in a tie for tenth place. In the 2014 Atlantic 10 tournament, the Rams were defeated by Massachusetts in the second round.

Off season

Departures

Incoming Transfers

Incoming recruits

Roster

Schedule

|-
!colspan=9 style="background:#75B2DD; color:#002b7f;"| Non-conference regular season

|-
!colspan=9 style="background:#75B2DD; color:#002b7f;"| Atlantic 10 regular season

|-
!colspan=9 style="background:#75B2DD; color:#002b7f;"| Atlantic 10 tournament

|-
!colspan=9 style="background:#75B2DD; color:#002b7f;"| NIT

See also
 2014–15 Rhode Island Rams women's basketball team

References

Rhode Island Rams men's basketball seasons
Rhode Island
Rhode Island